Nowickia ferox is a species of fly in the family Tachinidae first described by Georg Wolfgang Franz Panzer in 1809.

Distribution and habitat
This species is present in most of Europe.

Description

These flies have a black hairy thorax and a yellow-red abdomen, with a black longitudinal marking in the middle and numerous long straight bristles at the end. Wings are hyaline (glass like), yellowish at the base. Basal half of the palps are brown or blackish. Males are a little concave in theirs dorsal centre. In the abdomen only segments 7 and 8 are hairy.

Biology
Nowickia ferox is a univoltine species. Adults can be found from mid-June to October, with a peak from June to August. They fed on nectar and pollen, especially of Centaurea jacea. Larvae develop in the dark arches moth (Apamea monoglypha).

References

External links
 Arthropoda.pavouci

Diptera of Europe
Tachininae